Eduardo Rafael Heras León (born 5 August 1940) is a Cuban writer and professor who was awarded the Cuban National Literature Prize in 2014.

Biography 
León was born in Cerro, Havana on the 5 August 1940. When he was 12 years old his father died, and he and his brothers had to work to support his family. In high school he collaborated with the rebels of the 26 July Movement.

After January 1, 1959 he joined the revolutionary militia. He fought in support of the revolutionary government in the attack on "Bahía de Cochinos," (the Bay of Pigs) in April 1961. In 1968 he won the David Prize for his book La guerra tuvo seis nombres ("The War Had Six Names"). In 1970, he won another prize for the book Los pasos en la hierba ("The Steps on the Grass"), this time awarded by Casa de las Américas.

With the support of the Cuban Ministry of Culture and UNEAC, he founded the Centro de Formación Literaria Onelio Jorge Cardoso (es) in 1998, a place where young talents learn literary techniques.

In February 2015, he won the National Prize for Literature.

Bibliography
La guerra tuvo seis nombres ("The War Had Six Names") (novel, won the 1968 David UNEAC Award)
Los pasos en la hierba ("The Steps on the Grass") (stories, nominated for the 1970 CASA Award), several editions
Acero ("Steel") (novel, Ed. Letras Cubanas, pub. 1977).
A fuego limpio ("Clean Fire") (stories, Ed. Letras Cubanas, pub. 1981).
Cuestión de principio ("For Principles") (stories, won 1983 UNEAC National Prize and 1986 National Critics' Prize)
La nueva guerra ("The New War") (Short story anthology, Ed. Letras Cubanas, pub. 1989).
Balada para un amor possible ("Song for an Impossible Love") (plaquette, Ed. Extramuros, 1992).
La noche del capitán ("The Captain′s Night") (anthology, UNAM, 1995).
Dolce vita ("Sweet Life") (Ediciones Unión, 2013)
Cuentos Completos ("Stories of all a life", pub. 2014)

References 

1940 births
Living people
Cuban short story writers